Yovani Humberto Romero Guevara (born April 11, 1980 in Santa Rosa de Lima, El Salvador) is a  Salvadoran footballer who currently plays for Vista Hermosa in the Primera División de Fútbol de El Salvador.

Club career
Nicknamed el Largo (the tall one), Romero started his career at Segunda División de El Salvador club Liberal and played for Atlético Chaparratique before joining Vista Hermosa in 2004. In May 2006 he stayed behind in the United States after an apparent injury but did not return in time so Vista Hermosa decided to offload him.

After a season without a club he again returned to Vista Hermosa for the 2012 Clausura.

International career
Romero made his debut for El Salvador in an August 2005 friendly match against Paraguay, coming on as a substitute for Deris Umanzor. The game proved to be his sole international match.

References

External links

1980 births
Living people
People from La Unión Department
Association football midfielders
Salvadoran footballers
El Salvador international footballers
C.D. Vista Hermosa footballers